Edward Jerome Tarver (born July 22, 1959) is an American lawyer who served as the United States Attorney for the Southern District of Georgia. A Democrat, Tarver is a former Georgia State Senator. He was a candidate for the United States Senate in the 2020 special election in Georgia, receiving 0.5 percent of the vote in the jungle primary.

Early life and education
Tarver attended Augusta College and graduated in 1981. He joined the United States Army and served as a field artillery officer before attending the University of Georgia School of Law, graduating in 1991.

Career 
He served as a law clerk for United States federal judge Dudley H. Bowen Jr. after graduating from law school.

Tarver represented the 22nd district in the Georgia State Senate, taking office in 2005. He was sworn in as United States Attorney in December 2009, becoming the first African American United States Attorney from the Southern District of Georgia. He considered running for the 2016 election to the United States Senate as a member of the Democratic Party. In February 2020, he registered to run in the 2020 special election. Despite early polls showing him with the support of up to 5% of voters, Tarver failed to gain traction in the primary as Democrats rallied around eventual winner Raphael Warnock. In the first round of the election, Tarver finished 14th out of 20 candidates with 26,333 or 0.54% of the vote.

See also
 2017 dismissal of U.S. attorneys

References

External links

Campaign website

|-

1959 births
21st-century American politicians
African-American lawyers
Augusta State University alumni
Democratic Party Georgia (U.S. state) state senators
Living people
Politicians from Augusta, Georgia
United States Army officers
United States Attorneys for the Southern District of Georgia
University of Georgia School of Law alumni
Candidates in the 2020 United States Senate elections
21st-century African-American politicians
20th-century African-American people